Candy's Airline is the seventh studio album by Hong Kong singer Candy Lo, released on 25 June 2003. For this album Lo continued her collaboration with long-time friend and producer Kubert Leung with whom she also worked on previous albums.

Track listing
Translations of song titles in brackets.

"站站舞" Jaam6 Jaam6 Mou5 (Dancing At Every Stop) - 4:37
"吉祥物" Gat1 Yeung4 Mat6 (Mascotte) - 3:35
"拉丁夜晚" Laai1 Ding1 Ye6 Maan5 (The Latin Night) - 3:24
"戀愛很遠" Lyun5 Oi3 Han2 Yun5 (Love Is Far Away) - 3:36
"三角誌" Saam1 Gok3 Ji3 (Love Triangle) - 3:32  
"紙皮箱" Ji2 Pei4 Seung1 (Cardboard Box) - 3:33
"音樂人民" Jam1 Ngok6 Jan4 Man4 (Musical People) - 3:52
"天祐我們" Tin1 Yau6 Ngo5 Mun4 (Sky Bless Us!) - 3:27
"猜樓梯" Chaai1 Lau4 Tai1 (Step Game) - 3:25
"昏迷" Fan1 Mai4 (Coma) - 4:28
"不插電" Bat1 Chaap3 Din6 (Unplugged) - 3:40

VCD
"三角誌" (PV)
"吉祥物" (PV)
"猜樓梯" (PV)

Candy Lo albums
2003 albums